Howard Moore (5 March 1947 – 9 October 2012) was an English professional footballer who played as a winger.

Career statistics
Sources:

References

1947 births
2012 deaths
Sportspeople from Canterbury
Footballers from Kent
English footballers
Association football wingers
Ashford United F.C. players
Coventry City F.C. players
Gillingham F.C. players
Southend United F.C. players
Port Vale F.C. players
Margate F.C. players
Canterbury City F.C. players
Dartford F.C. players
Southern Football League players
English Football League players